Stauros is a Greek word for a stake or an implement of capital punishment. The Greek New Testament uses the word stauros for the instrument of Jesus' crucifixion, and it is generally translated cross in Christian contexts. This article covers the use of the word for other contexts.

Etymology
The word stauros comes from the verb ἵστημι (histēmi: "straighten up", "stand"), which in turn comes from the Proto-Indo-European root *steh2-u- "pole", related to the root *steh2- "to stand, to set"

In Antiquity
In ancient Greek stauros meant either an "upright pale or stake", a "cross, as the instrument of crucifixion", or a "pale for impaling a corpse".

In older Greek texts, stauros means "pole" and in Homer's works is always used in the plural number, never in the singular. Instances are attested in which these pales or stakes were split and set to serve as a palisade pig sty by Eumaeus in the Odyssey or as piles for the foundation of a lake dwelling on the Prasiad Lake recounted by Herodotus.

From stauros was derived the verb ; this verb was used by Polybius to describe execution of prisoners by the general Hannibal at the siege of Tunis; Hannibal is then himself executed on the same stauros. Also from stauros was the verb for impalement: anastaurizo. The fifth century BC writer Ctesias, in a fragment preserved by Photios I of Constantinople in his Bibliotheca, describes the impalement of Inaros II by Megabyzus in these terms. Thucydides, also in the fifth century, likewise described the execution of Inaros in this way. The practice was called anastaurosis. As described by Herodotus in the fifth century BC and by Xenophon of Ephesus in the second century AD, anastaurosis referred to impalement. Herodotus described the execution of Polycrates of Samos by the satrap of Lydia, Oroetus, as anastaurosis. According to the authoritative A Greek–English Lexicon, the verbs for "impale" and "crucify" are ambiguous. Plato refers to the punishment, in his dialogue Gorgias, using anastauroó. Plutarch, at the beginning of the second century AD, described the execution on three stakes of the eunuch Masabates as anastaurosis in his Life of Artaxerxes. Usually, Plutarch referred to stauroi in the context of pointed poles standing upright.

From the Hellenistic period, Anastaurosis was the Greek word for the Roman capital punishment crucifixion. Polybius reports the crucifixion of a Carthaginian general by his own soldiers using the verb ἀνασταυρόω, while Plutarch, using the same verb, describes Hannibal as having thus executed his local guides in his Life of Fabius Maximus, though it is unclear what kind of "suspension punishment" was involved. In the first century BC Diodorus Siculus describes the mythical queen Semiramis as threatened with 'crucifixion'. Diodorus elsewhere referred to a bare bronze pole as a stauros and no further details are provided about the stauros involved in the threat to Semiramis. Lucian of Samosata instead uses the verb anaskolopizo to describe the crucifixion of Jesus. Elsewhere, in a text of questionable attribution, Lucian likens the shape of crucifixions to that of the letter T in the final words of The Consonants at Law - Sigma vs. Tau, in the Court of the Seven Vowels; the word σταυρός is not mentioned.

Interpretation 
Nineteenth-century Anglican theologian E. W. Bullinger's Companion Bible glossed stauros as "an upright pale or stake", interpreting crucifixion as "hung upon a stake ... stauros was not two pieces of wood at any angle". In 1877 Bullinger wrote:

Nineteenth-century Free Church of Scotland theologian Patrick Fairbairn's Imperial Bible Dictionary defined stauros thus:

Henry Dana Ward, a Millerite Adventist, claimed that the Epistle of Barnabas, which may have been written in the first century and was certainly earlier than 135, said that the object on which Jesus died was cross-shaped, but claimed that the author of the Epistle invented this concept. He likewise defined a stauros as a plain stake.

A similar view was put forward by John Denham Parsons in 1896.

In the 20th century, William Edwy Vine also reasoned that the stauros as an item for execution was different to the Christian cross. Vine's Expository Dictionary's definition states that stauros:

In the 21st century, David W. Chapman counters that:

Chapman stresses the comparison with Prometheus chained to the Caucasus Mountains made by the second century AD writer Lucian. Chapman identifies that Lucian uses the verbs άνασκολοπίζω, άνασταυρόω, and σταυρόω interchangeably, and argues that by the time of the Roman expansion into Asia Minor, the shape of the stauros used by the Romans for executions was more complex than a simple stake, and that cross-shaped crucifixions may have been the norm in the Roman era. Presbyterian theologian John Granger Cook interprets writers living when executions by stauros were being carried out as indicating that from the first century AD there is evidence that the execution stauros was normally made of more than one piece of wood and resembled cross-shaped objects such as the letter T. Anglican theologian David Tombs suggests the stauros referred to the upright part of a two-beam cross, with patibulum as the cross-piece.  Similar statements are made by Jack Finegan, Robin M. Jensen, Craig Evans, Linda Hogan and Dylan Lee Lehrke.

See also

 Christian cross
 Descriptions in antiquity of the execution cross
 Instrument of Jesus' crucifixion
 Staurogram
 Staurology, or Theology of the Cross
 Stavros, the modern Greek name derived from stauros

References

New Testament Greek words and phrases
Cross symbols